Robert Herbert Planck (August 19, 1902 – October 31, 1971) was an American cinematographer. He was nominated for four Academy Awards in the category Best Cinematography for the films Anchors Aweigh, The Three Musketeers, Little Women and Lili. Planck died in October 1971 in Camarillo, California, at the age of 69. He was buried in Forest Lawn Memorial Park.

Selected filmography 
 Anchors Aweigh (1945; co-nominated with Charles P. Boyle)
 The Three Musketeers (1948)
 Little Women (1949; co-nominated with Charles Schoenbaum)
 Lili (1953)

References

External links 

1902 births
1971 deaths
People from Huntington, Indiana
American cinematographers
Burials at Forest Lawn Memorial Park (Hollywood Hills)